Yendi is one of the constituencies represented in the Parliament of Ghana. It elects one Member of Parliament (MP) by the first past the post system of election. It is located in the Northern Region of Ghana. he current member of Parliament for the constituency is Sulemana Ibn Iddrisu. He was elected  on the ticket of the National Democratic Congress (NDC) and  won a majority of 617 votes more than candidate closest in the race, to win the constituency election to become the MP. He succeeded Malik Al-Hassan Yakubu who had represented the constituency in the 4th Republican parliament on the ticket of the New Patriotic Party (NPP).

Note: That the current mp for the Yendi Constituency in the 8th Parliament of Ghana is the Honourable Farouk U. Aliu Mahama of the New Patriotic Party, as @ 7 January 2021.

See also
List of Ghana Parliament constituencies

References 

Parliamentary constituencies in the Northern Region (Ghana)